The 2nd Annual Streamy Awards, presented by the International Academy of Web Television, was the second installment of the Streamy Awards honoring streaming television series. The awards were held on Sunday, April 11, 2010, at the Orpheum Theatre in Los Angeles, California. Paul Scheer served as the host of the presentation. Over 1,300 audience members were in attendance and the show was broadcast live online.

The show was met with technical difficulties and other disruptions throughout the ceremony and was criticized for its humour which was viewed as unfunny, crude, and deprecatory of internet culture. Controversy surrounding the reception of the event led to the International Academy of Web Television splitting from the show to create its own separate awards show, the IAWTV Awards, and a two-year hiatus of the Streamys.

Winners and nominees 

The nominees were announced on March 1, 2010 and the finalists for the Audience Choice Award for Best Web Series were announced on March 29. The Streamy Craft Award winners were announced in a ceremony hosted by Jim Festante at the Barnsdall Gallery Theater on April 7. The remaining awards were announced in the main ceremony at the Orpheum Theatre on April 11. Winners of the categories were selected by the International Academy of Web Television except for the Audience Choice Award for Best Web Series which was put to a public vote.

Winners are listed first, in bold.

Streamy Visionary Award Honoree
Chad Hurley - The co-founder of YouTube

Web series with multiple nominations and awards

Reception
The show was poorly received by viewers, attendees and sponsors of the event, leading to an apology from the producer, Brady Brim-Deforest, and rumours that sponsors of the event wanted their money refunded. The show was criticized for its long runtime of over 3 hours, technical failures throughout the ceremony, and for containing unfunny, crude and sexist jokes, including jokes about porn, masturbation and vaginal rejuvenation. The show was also interrupted by streakers as part of a stunt by Best Reality or Documentary Web Series nominee Streak to Win. The poor reception of the event, and the surrounding controversy, resulted in the International Academy of Web Television separating from the Streamys to create its own awards, the IAWTV Awards, and a two-year hiatus of the Streamys.

Many online content creators, including iJustine and Chris Hardwick, felt that the ceremony did not represent online content creation and worried that it would be a setback for the medium being taken seriously. iJustine said that the show's skits had made her feel uncomfortable and condemned the excessive vulgarity, saying that she had left the event "feeling confused, embarrassed and a bunch of other emotions that I still have yet to put my finger on." Jim Louderback, CEO of the multi-channel network Revision3, called the show a "misogynistic, puerile, protracted and poorly executed event" and criticised one of the monologues that "went beyond poking fun at the industry, and was more like a spit in the face." YouTuber Michael Buckley also criticized the event in a tweet saying "All of the technical problems were one thing but it seemed like the jokes were picking on the internet – not CELEBRATING what we do." Erin Broadley of LA Weekly similarly opined "The technical difficulties were forgivable for an event only two years young; it was the tone of the program that was most upsetting to people, who saw last year's optimism replaced by self-deprecating humor and masturbation jokes". Due to nominees and award winners' disappointment with the show, an unofficial redo of the ceremony was held at the ACME Comedy Theatre.

See also
List of Streamy Award winners

References

External links
Streamy Awards website

Streamy Awards
Streamy Awards
2010 in American television
2010 in Internet culture